Izvoru may refer to several places in Romania:

Izvoru, a commune in Argeș County
Izvoru, a village in Cozieni Commune, Buzău County
Izvoru, a village in Tisău Commune, Buzău County
Izvoru, a village in Valea Lungă Commune, Dâmbovița County
Izvoru, a village in Vișina Commune, Dâmbovița County
Izvoru, a village in Gogoșari Commune, Giurgiu County
Izvoru, a village in Vânătorii Mici Commune, Giurgiu County
Izvoru, a village in Ion Creangă Commune, Neamț County
Izvoru, a village in Găneasa Commune, Olt County
Izvoru, a village in Provița de Sus Commune, Prahova County
Izvoru, a village in Crețeni Commune, Vâlcea County
Izvoru Crișului, a commune in Cluj County
Izvoru Mare, a village in Peștera Commune, Constanța County
Izvoru Mureșului, a village in Voșlăbeni Commune, Harghita County